I Am a Singer (season 2), is the second season of the Chinese TV series I Am a Singer produced by Hunan TV, produced by Hong Tao, and the show's music director is Kubert Leung.

The season premiered on January 3, 2014 and concluded on April 4, 2014, with a live Biennial concert aired on April 11, 2014. Chinese Singer Han Lei was the winner of the season, with Hong Kong singer G.E.M. finishing as runner-up.

Competition format 
Most of the competition format were retained from the first season, with seven singers each week singing for a 500-member audience; they then cast their ballots for the top three singers of their preference after all the singers had performed. Both the Qualifying and Knockout round scores are combined and decide which singer with a fewer vote share was eliminated.

This season introduced format changes to the Revival round, which renamed to Breakouts; any first-round singers who survived every elimination rounds were automatically exempt and thus guaranteeing one of seven places in the finals; remaining singers compete along with eliminated singers to vie for the remaining places in the finals, where the number is seven minus the number of exempted singers. Another change made is to the withdrawn singers, singers who voluntarily withdrew from the competition without performing have not been eligible for return performances, in addition to being ineligible to participate in the Breakout rounds. In the previous season, Chyi Chin (who withdrew from the competition on week 7) was given return performance on week 10, but Chin was not eligible from participating the Revival round.

This is also the first season to feature Biennial Concert, aired one week after the finals. Unlike other weeks, Biennial concert is a live-telecast exhibition performance with no voting featuring the best singers of the season plus selected singers from former seasons, similar to Graduation in the original Korean franchise.

Contestants
The following singers participated in the second season listed in alphabetical order (singers without a placement for the final is listed as finalist and singers withdrew were listed as withdrawn):

Key:
 – Winner
 – Runner-up
 – Other finalist
 – Withdrew

Future appearances
Han Lei, Gary Chaw, Jason Zhang and Bibi Zhou returned as guest performers for the Biennial concert on the third season the following year. Han again returned as a guest performer in the finale of the fourth season for an all-winners exhibition performance.

Zhang returned as a contestant on the fifth season. Shang Wenjie, G.E.M., and Zhang returned again as a guest assistant singers on the finale of the fifth, sixth, and seventh seasons, respectively.

Results

Details of competitions

1st round

Qualifying 
Taping Date: December 19, 2013
Airdate: January 3, 2014
This episode featured the winning duo from the last season, Yu Quan; however, a majority of their performance was edited out of broadcast due to time constraints.

 A. Voted 4th in the 40s and 50s age group
 B. Voted 1st in the 10s age group
 C. Voted 6th in the 20s and 50s age group
 D. Voted 1st in the 20s, 30s and 50s age group
 E. Voted 3rd in the 40s and 50s age group

Knockout 
Taping Date: December 26, 2013
Airdate: January 10, 2014

 A. Voted 2nd in the 50s age group
 B. Voted 1st in the 30s age group
 C. Voted 4th in the 40s age group
 D. Voted 4th in the 10s and 30 age group
 E. Voted 1st in the 10s, 20s and 40s age group
 F. Voted 1st in the 30s and 50s age group

Overall ranking 

 A. Has one vote less with 4th place singer

2nd round

Qualifying 
Taping Date: January 9, 2014
Airdate: January 17, 2014
The first substitute singer of the season was Jason Zhang.

 A. Voted 4th in the 20s age group
 B. Voted 2nd in the 20s and 30s age group
 C. Voted 5th in the 50s age group
 D. Voted 1st in the 10s, 20s and 30s age group
 E. Voted 4th in the 10s and 30s age group
 F. Voted 2nd in the 10s and 50s age group

Knockout 
Taping Date: January 16, 2014
Airdate: January 23, 2014
Chang and G.E.M. were originally going to perform 1st and 3rd, respectively, but swapped after a mutual agreement with both singers. Luo also requested to swap their performance order with Wei, but refused.

 A. Voted 1st in the 20s, 30s and 40s age group
 B. Voted 3rd in the 10s and 40s age group
 C. Voted 4th in the 40s age group
 D. Voted 4th in the 10s age group
 E. Voted 2nd in the 50s age group
 F. Voted 1st in the 10s age group

Overall ranking

3rd round

Qualifying 
Taping Date: January 23, 2014
Airdate: January 31, 2014
The second substitute singer of the season was Victor Wong.

 A. Voted 1st in the 10s and 20s age group
 B. Voted 4th in the 30s age group
 C. Voted 1st in the 30s, 40s and 50s age group
 D. Voted 5th in the 30s and 40s age group
 E. Voted 4th in the 10s, 20s and 40s age group
 F. Voted 2nd in the 50s age group
 G. Voted 5th in the 50s age group

Knockout 
Taping Date: January 30, 2014
Airdate: February 7, 2014
Wong and Zhang were originally going to perform 1st and 4th, respectively, but were later changed when Zhang Jie requested to reorder his performance along Wong Pin Kuan, as well as G.E.M. having to retake her performance due to a headphone malfunction. Luo withdrew from the competition prior to the results due to her pregnancy (she was seven-months pregnant at time of taping and that her expected delivery is near), but cited that she will return. The eliminations for the Knockout round went ahead as normal.

Overall ranking

4th round

Qualifying 
Taping Date: February 13, 2014
Airdate: February 21, 2014  
Due to Luo's withdrawal, one more singer for a total of two singers substituted the singers; they were Man Wenjun and Shila Amzah. During this week, Zhou forget to bring the headphone when performing.

Knockout 
Taping Date: February 20, 2014
Airdate: February 28, 2014 
Zhou and Shila were originally going to perform 4th and 7th respectively, but were changed when Chang and Man also requested to reorder the performance as well.

Overall ranking 

 A. Zhang garnered 274 votes in the first round.
 B. Han garnered 302 votes in the first round.
 C. Shila garnered 298 votes in the first round.
 D. G.E.M. garnered 185 votes in the first round.
 E. Zhou garnered 117 votes in the first round.
 F. Chang garnered 173 votes in the first round.
 G. Man garnered 142 votes in the first round.

5th round

Qualifying (Ultimate Qualifying Round) 
Taping Date: February 27, 2014
Airdate: March 7, 2014
The season's last substitute singer was Power Station. G.E.M. and Chang were originally going to perform 2nd and 5th respectively, but later swapped when both singers mutually agreed their request.

Knockout (Ultimate Knockout Round) 
Taping Date: March 6, 2014
Airdate: March 14, 2014

Overall ranking 

 A. Has one vote less with 1st place singer

Breakout 
Taping Date: March 13, 2014
Airdate: March 21, 2014
The Repechage round was renamed to Breakout rounds, and unlike the first season, where only one Breakout finalist was offered, the number of Breakout finalists was seven minus the number of remaining initial singers, who were automatically exempted from the Breakouts; four singers (Chang, Han, G.E.M. and Zhou) were the initial singers, thus three Breakout finalists were offered.

The other two singers (Shila and Zhang) will participate along previously eliminated singers (with the exception of Luo) for a chance to enter the semi-finals. The singers sang one song, with the three singers having the most votes will qualified for the Semifinals. Shila, Zhang and Chaw were the top three singers (who 30.35%, 22.01% and 19.51% of the votes, respectively) garnered were the top three singers who received the highest number of votes, and advanced to the finals. During the vote count, eight votes were rejected, and it also revealed Shila and Zhang garnered 448 and 325 votes, respectively.

Semifinal 
Taping Date: March 20, 2014
Airdate: March 28, 2014 
The semifinals carries a 30% weightage in the final round. Unlike the finals from the last season, the audience could still cast three votes instead of one.

Finals 
Airdate:  April 4, 2013
The finals was divided into two rounds, with the first song being a duet with a guest singer, and the second song being a solo encore performance. The weightages for both rounds were 30% and 40%, respectively; the singer accumulating the highest total combining from the three rounds was the winner.

1st round 
The first round of the finals was a guest singer's duet, which carries a 30% weightage of the final round scores. The order of performance of this round is determined by the singer who place first in the Semifinals. This round features double elimination; the two singers who received the two lowest votes combined from this round were eliminated.

Had Bibi Zhou and Phil Chang advanced to the next round, they would've performed "The Offering to Love" and "Four Hundred Dollars" as their encore songs, respectively.

2nd round 
The second round of the finals is an encore song, which carries a 40% weightage of the final round scores. The order of performance of this round is determined by the singer who place first in the first song.

Winner of Battle 
Before the final results are announced, the host named G.E.M. and Han Lei as "Ultimate Winner Candidates". Han was declared the winner with 28.31% of the combined total, beating G.E.M.'s combined total of 24.95%.

Biennial concert 
Airdate:  April 11, 2014
The concert consisted of ten singers from the first two series, which included the top five finalists, as well season 1's singers Yu Quan, Terry Lin, Aska Yang, Julia Peng and Shang Wenjie.

Ratings 

|-
|1
|
|2.200
|5.70
|1
|-
|2
|
|2.149
|5.52
|1
|-
|3
|
|2.076
|5.33
|1
|-
|4
|
|1.913
|4.99
|1
|-
|5
|
|
|
|1
|-
|6
|
|2.354
|6.02
|1
|-
|7
|
|2.140
|5.35
|1
|-
|8
|
|2.103
|5.38
|1
|-
|9
|
|2.266
|5.90
|1
|-
|10
|
|2.204
|5.79
|1
|-
|11
|
|2.375
|6.28
|1
|-
|12
|
|2.540
|6.65
|1
|-
|13
|
|
|
|1
|-
|SP1
|
|2.044
|9.40
|1

References 

Singer (TV series)
Chinese music television series
2014 in Chinese music
2014 Chinese television seasons